Boom Bap & Blues is the first collaborative studio album by American singer-songwriter Jared Evan and producer Statik Selektah. The project was released on February 26, 2013. The album features guest appearances by Lil Fame of M.O.P., Joey Bada$$, Action Bronson, Wais P, Hoodie Allen and Termanology.

Track listing
All songs produced by Statik Selektah.

References

2013 albums
Statik Selektah albums
Albums produced by Statik Selektah
Collaborative albums